The 8th Legislative Assembly of British Columbia sat from 1899 to 1900. The members were elected in the British Columbia general election held in July 1898. Robert Beaven was asked to form a government but was not able to garner sufficient support, so Charles Augustus Semlin became premier. After a major government bill was defeated in February 1900, Semlin's government was dismissed. Joseph Martin succeeded Semlin but his government was subsequently defeated on a motion of no-confidence. An election followed later that year.

William Thomas Forster served as speaker.

Members of the 8th General Assembly 
The following members were elected to the assembly in 1898:

Notes:

By-elections 
By-elections were held for the following members appointed to the provincial cabinet, as was required at the time:
 Francis Lovett Carter-Cotton, Minister of Finance, acclaimed October 15, 1898
 Joseph Martin, Attorney General, acclaimed October 15, 1898
 Charles Augustus Semlin, Premier, acclaimed October 15, 1898
 John Frederick Hume, Provincial Secretary and Minister of Mines, acclaimed October 15, 1898
 Alexander Henderson, Attorney General, acclaimed August 31, 1899

By-elections were held to replace members for various other reasons:

Notes:

Other changes 
Vancouver City (Joseph Martin res. on appointment as premier, February 28, 1900)

References 

Political history of British Columbia
Terms of British Columbia Parliaments
1899 establishments in British Columbia
1900 disestablishments in British Columbia
19th century in British Columbia